Binghamton is an unincorporated community in Solano County, California, United States.

References

Unincorporated communities in California
Unincorporated communities in Solano County, California